Albertus Antonius Hinsz (also: Albert Anthoni Hinsch; born 1704 in Hamburg, died 17 March 1785 in Uithuizen, the Netherlands) was an organ builder in the Netherlands, who followed in the tradition of Arp Schnitger.

Life 

In 1728 he settled in Groningen where, on 28 December 1732, he married the widow of Franz Caspar Schnitger, taking over Schnitger's workshop. Hinsz built numerous organs in the North German tradition, across the provinces of Groningen and Friesland. Many of his organs survive to the current day. Tonally, Hinsz organs are noted for their "golden" tone, a result of his tierce-containing mixtures. Architecturally, the casework of his organs follows the pattern of Arp Schnitger. Hinsz died during the construction of the organ at Uithuizermeeden. He is buried in the Lutherse Kerk in Groningen, where he is commemorated with a memorial stone.

After his death, his stepson  jr. together with Heinrich Hermann Freytag took over his workshop, which continued to build organs in Netherlands in the tradition of Arp Schnitger into the 19th century.

Organs on which Hinsz worked 

The roman numerals indicate the number of manuals. An uppercase "P" indicates an independent pedal organ with its own sounding stops, while a lowercase "p" indicates a pull-down pedal linked to the keyboards, merely allowing the player to play manual keyboard notes with their feet. The Arabic numerals indicate the number of sounding registers (i.e. stop-knobs excluding accessories such as tremulants and couplers).

Literature 
 Jan Jongepier (Ed.): Een konstkundig orgelmaker. Enkele bijdragen over het werk van de orgelmaker Albertus Anthoni Hinsz (1704–1785). Stichting Groningen Orgelland, Groningen 1994, .
 Willem Jan Dorgelo: Albertus Anthoni Hinsz. Orgelmaker 1704–1785. Lykele Jansma, Augustinusga 1985.
 De Groninger orgelmaker Albertus Anthoni Hinsz (1704–1785). Ommelander Museum, Leens 1981.

External links 
 Bolsward, Martinikerk (in Dutch)
 Bovenkerk, Kampen (in Dutch)
 Hervormde Kerk, Nordbroek
 The Hinsz organ at Appingedam is demonstrated by Sietze de Vries
 The Hinsz organ at Leens is explored by de Vries and Bálint Karosi

References 

1704 births
1785 deaths